Mary Gunvor Irene Andersson, was a Swedish author and playwright. Her work was primarily about the issues effecting the lives of women and the poor.

Biography 
Born as one of seven children to a working-class family in Tunaberg in 1929, Andersson spent most of her childhood in an orphanage in the Sorgenfri (literally "care free") district of Malmö. She suffered from anaemia at a young age, and started working at the age of 13, with her experiences of working in a mustard factory later forming the basis of her 1991 book Dåliga mänskor (Bad People), which was later performed as a play at the Malmö Music Theatre in 1999.

Andersson made her debut as a playwright in 1977 with the play Maria från Borstahusen (Maria from Borstahusen), which played in the Skånska teatern. This told the story of a poor fisher-girl called Maria living in the poor areas of Malmö at the end of the 19th century, and was based on Andersson's grandmother Hilda. She later wrote a book with the same title which was published in 1980. Her first radio play, the 1979 Tjänsteflickan (The Maid), was an autobiographical story of her life until then, and was also published as a novel in 1984.

Her debut novel, Sorgenfri, was published in 1979. It was followed by Barnrika in 1983, and Solgårdarna in 1986. The book  Andersson also wrote non-fiction, including in 1980 Asbestarbetarna berättar (The Asbestos Workers Tell) about the working conditions in an asbestos cement factory, and Maria och Almathea (Maria and Almathea) in 1988 about the 1908 harbour workers' strike in Malmö. Her final book, the autobiography Den vingabrödna (The Winged Bread) was published in 2009. In 2015 she was awarded the Malmö City Culture Prize.

Andersson had two children. She died in her sleep in a care-home in Malmö in 2020. She is buried in Limhamn Cemetery in the same city.

References

 
1929 births
2020 deaths
20th-century Swedish women writers
21st-century Swedish women writers
People from Nyköping Municipality